Hazi A.K. Khan College, is a general degree college in Murshidabad district. It offers undergraduate courses in arts. It is affiliated to University of Kalyani.

Departments

Arts and Commerce
Bengali
English
History
Political Science
Philosophy
Education
Geography

Notable alumni 

 NK Mondal(Indian Writer)

Accreditation
The college is recognized by the University Grants Commission (UGC).

See also
List of institutions of higher education in West Bengal
Education in India
Education in West Bengal

References

External links
Hazi A.K. Khan College
University of Kalyani
University Grants Commission
National Assessment and Accreditation Council

Colleges affiliated to University of Kalyani
Universities and colleges in Murshidabad district
2008 establishments in West Bengal
Educational institutions established in 2008